Kristianstads DFF is a women's association football club from Kristianstad, Sweden. The club is affiliated to the Skånes Fotbollförbund.

History 
The original club Wä IF played in from 1989 to 1994 in the Damallsvenskan. The club was reformed in 1998 when Kristianstads FF merged with Wä IF to become Kristianstad / Wä DFF. The team continued as Kristianstad / Wä DFF during the seasons of 1999 until 2001 in the Damallsvenskan. In 2006 was the club was renamed again to the current name Kristianstads DFF. Prominent players to have represented the club include Malin Andersson, Therese Sjögran, Sara Johansson and Nilla Fischer. In 2005 the team finished third in the Söderettan, before winning the Söderettan unbeaten in 2008 and clinching promotion to the Damallsvenskan. In July 2009 the players posed for a nude team photograph, to raise funds as the club was in financial difficulty. In 2018, the club changed their homeground from Vilans IP to Kristianstads Fotbollsarena. In the same year the team achieved their best league placing since their foundation, securing a fourth-place finish in the Damallsvenskan.

Homeground 
Kristianstads DFF play their home games at Kristianstads Fotbollsarena in Kristianstad.

Club colours 
The team colours are Orange shirt and black shorts and socks for home games and white for away games.

Managers 
  Ulf Berglund (2008–2009)
  Pierre Persson (2010–2011)
  Elísabet Gunnarsdóttir (2009– )

Current squad

Former players 

For details of current and former players, see :Category:Kristianstads DFF players.

Staff

Sports 
Head coach:
  Elisabet Gunnarsdottir	

Assistant coach:
  Alexander Fridlund

Strength coach:
  Kristín Hólm Geirsdóttir
  Orri Sigurðsson

Goalkeeper coach:
  Bojan Jovic

Kit manager:
  Isabella Sjöstedt

Management 
Club Manager:
  Albert Sigurdsson

Sports Director:
  Lovisa Ström

References

External links 
 Kristianstads DFF – Official website 

 
Women's football clubs in Sweden
Football clubs in Skåne County
1998 establishments in Sweden
Damallsvenskan teams
Association football clubs established in 1998
Sport in Kristianstad Municipality